Kannada dialects, in the broad sense incorporating the Kannada–Badaga languages, are spoken in and around Karnataka. Apart from literary Kannada, used in television,  news and literature, there are many spoken dialects.

Kannada dialects 
Dialects of Kannada language fall into four groups:
CoastalMangaluru
Halakki
Barkur
Havyaka
Kundagannada
Sirsi Kannada
Malenadu
Nadavar 

NorthernVijayapura 
Kalaburagi 
Dharwad  
Belagavi 

South-WesternArebhashe
Tiptur 
Rabakavi
Nanjangudu Kannada

SouthernAruvu
Bengaluru
Chamarajanagar 
Mandya 
Banakal

Kannada languages 
Kannada is the Badaga-related language spoken by the Badaga community in the Nilgiri region in Tamil Nadu.

Urali, Holiya and Sholaga are also close to Kannada.

Scholars of Kannada languages
 Aluru Venkata Rao
 Shamba Joshi
Kuvempu.K.V Puttappa
 D. L. Narasimhachar
 M. Chidananda Murthy
 T. V. Venkatachala Shastri
 M. M. Kalburgi
 Hampa Nagarajaiah
 Kamala Hampana
 D. N. Shankar Bhat
 A. K. Ramanujan
 H. Tipperudraswamy
 Sha. Shettar

See also

 Diglossic regions - Kannada
 Dialect or language

References 

Kannada language
Languages of Karnataka
Dravidian languages